This is a list of articles giving brief summaries of each country in Asia. The transcontinental countries situated in both Asia and Europe are also shown.

See also

Notes

 Asia
Wikipedia outlines
Geography of Asia